Montague Rhodes James  (1 August 1862 – 12 June 1936) was an English author, medievalist scholar and provost of King's College, Cambridge (1905–1918), and of Eton College (1918–1936). He was Vice-Chancellor of the University of Cambridge (1913–15).

James's work as a medievalist and scholar is still highly regarded, but he is best remembered for his ghost stories, which some consider among the best in the genre. He redefined the ghost story for the new century by abandoning many of the formal Gothic clichés of his predecessors and using more realistic contemporary settings. However, his protagonists and plots tend to reflect his own antiquarian interests. Accordingly, he is known as the originator of the "antiquarian ghost story".

Early life
James was born in a clergy house in Goodnestone, Dover, Kent, England, although his parents had associations with Aldeburgh in Suffolk. His father was Herbert James, an Evangelical Anglican clergyman, and his mother, Mary Emily (née Horton), was the daughter of a naval officer. He had two older brothers, Sydney and Herbert (nicknamed "Ber"), and an older sister, Grace. 

Sydney James later became Archdeacon of Dudley. From the age of three (1865) until 1909 James's home, if not always his residence, was at the Rectory in Great Livermere, Suffolk. This had previously been the childhood home of another eminent Suffolk antiquary, Thomas Martin of Palgrave (1696–1771). Several of James's ghost stories are set in Suffolk, including 'Oh, Whistle, and I'll Come to You, My Lad' (Felixstowe), "A Warning to the Curious" (Aldeburgh), "Rats" and "A Vignette" (Great Livermere).

In September 1873, he arrived as a boarder at Temple Grove School in East Sheen in west London, one of the leading boys' preparatory schools of the day. 

From September 1876 to August 1882, he studied at Eton College, where he claims to have translated the Book of Baruch from its original Ethiopic in 1879. He lived for many years, first as an undergraduate (1882–1885), then as a don and provost, at King's College, Cambridge, where he was also a member of the Pitt Club. 

The university provides settings for several of his tales. Apart from medieval subjects, James toured Europe often, including a memorable 1884 tour of France in a Cheylesmore tricycle, studied the classics and appeared very successfully in a staging of Aristophanes' play The Birds, with music by Hubert Parry. His ability as an actor was also apparent when he read his new ghost stories to friends at Christmas time.

Scholarly works

James is best known for his ghost stories, but his work as a medievalist scholar was prodigious and remains highly respected in scholarly circles. Indeed, the success of his stories was founded on his antiquarian talents and knowledge. His discovery of a manuscript fragment led to excavations in the ruins of the abbey at Bury St Edmunds, West Suffolk, in 1902, in which the graves of several twelfth-century abbots described by Jocelyn de Brakelond (a contemporary chronicler) were rediscovered, having been lost since the Dissolution of the Monasteries. He published a detailed description of the sculptured ceiling bosses of the cloisters of Norwich Cathedral in 1911. This included drawings of all the bosses in the north walk by C. J. W. Winter. His 1917 edition of the Latin hagiography of Æthelberht II of East Anglia, king and martyr, remains authoritative.

He catalogued many of the manuscript libraries of the colleges of the University of Cambridge. Among his other scholarly works, he wrote The Apocalypse in Art, which placed the English Apocalypse manuscripts into families. He also translated the New Testament apocrypha and contributed to the Encyclopaedia Biblica (1903). His ability to wear his learning lightly is apparent in his Suffolk and Norfolk (Dent, 1930), in which a great deal of knowledge is presented in a popular and accessible form, and in Abbeys.

He also achieved a great deal during his directorship of the Fitzwilliam Museum in Cambridge (1893–1908). He managed to secure a large number of important paintings and manuscripts, including notable portraits by Titian.

James was Provost of Eton College from 1918 to 1936. He was awarded the Order of Merit in 1930. He died in 1936 (age 73) and was buried in Eton town cemetery.

Ghost stories

James's ghost stories were published in a series of collections: Ghost Stories of an Antiquary (1904), More Ghost Stories of an Antiquary (1911), A Thin Ghost and Others (1919), and A Warning to the Curious and Other Ghost Stories (1925). The first hardback collected edition appeared in 1931. Many of the tales were written as Christmas Eve entertainments and read aloud to friends. This idea was used by the BBC in 2000 when they filmed Christopher Lee reading James's stories in a candle-lit room in King's College.

James perfected a method of story-telling which has since become known as Jamesian. The classic Jamesian tale usually includes the following elements:

 a characterful setting in an English village, seaside town or country estate; an ancient town in France, Denmark or Sweden; or a venerable abbey or university
 a nondescript and rather naive gentleman-scholar as protagonist (often of a reserved nature)
 the discovery of an old book or other antiquarian object that somehow unlocks, calls down the wrath, or at least attracts the unwelcome attention of a supernatural menace, usually from beyond the grave

According to James, the story must "put the reader into the position of saying to himself, 'If I'm not very careful, something of this kind may happen to me!'" He also perfected the technique of narrating supernatural events through implication and suggestion, letting his reader fill in the blanks, and focusing on the mundane details of his settings and characters in order to throw the horrific and bizarre elements into greater relief. He summed up his approach in his foreword to the anthology Ghosts and Marvels: "Two ingredients most valuable in the concocting of a ghost story are, to me, the atmosphere and the nicely managed crescendo. ... Let us, then, be introduced to the actors in a placid way; let us see them going about their ordinary business, undisturbed by forebodings, pleased with their surroundings; and into this calm environment let the ominous thing put out its head, unobtrusively at first, and then more insistently, until it holds the stage."

He also noted: "Another requisite, in my opinion, is that the ghost should be malevolent or odious: amiable and helpful apparitions are all very well in fairy tales or in local legends, but I have no use for them in a fictitious ghost story."

Despite his suggestion (in the essay "Stories I Have Tried to Write") that writers employ reticence in their work, many of James's tales depict scenes and images of savage and often disturbing violence. For example, in "Lost Hearts", pubescent children are taken in by a sinister dabbler in the occult who cuts their hearts from their still-living bodies. In a 1929 essay, James stated:
Reticence may be an elderly doctrine to preach, yet from the artistic point of view, I am sure it is a sound one. Reticence conduces to effect, blatancy ruins it, and there is much blatancy in a lot of recent stories. They drag in sex too, which is a fatal mistake; sex is tiresome enough in the novels; in a ghost story, or as the backbone of a ghost story, I have no patience with it. At the same time don't let us be mild and drab. Malevolence and terror, the glare of evil faces, 'the stony grin of unearthly malice', pursuing forms in darkness, and 'long-drawn, distant screams', are all in place, and so is a modicum of blood, shed with deliberation and carefully husbanded; the weltering and wallowing that I too often encounter merely recall the methods of M G Lewis.

Although not overtly sexual, plots of this nature have been perceived as unintentional metaphors of the Freudian variety. James's biographer Michael Cox wrote in M. R. James: An Informal Portrait (1983), "One need not be a professional psychoanalyst to see the ghost stories as some release from feelings held in check." Reviewing this biography (Daily Telegraph, 1983), the novelist and diarist Anthony Powell, who attended Eton under James's tutelage, commented that "I myself have heard it suggested that James's (of course platonic) love affairs were in fact fascinating to watch." Powell was referring to James's relationships with his pupils, not his peers.

Other critics have seen complex psychological undercurrents in James's work. His authorial revulsion from tactile contact with other people has been noted by Julia Briggs in Night Visitors: The Rise and Fall of the English Ghost Story (1977). As Nigel Kneale wrote in the introduction to the Folio Society edition of Ghost Stories of M. R. James, "In an age where every man is his own psychologist, M. R. James looks like rich and promising material. ... There must have been times when it was hard to be Monty James." Or, to put it another way, "Although James conjures up strange beasts and supernatural manifestations, the shock effect of his stories is usually strongest when he is dealing in physical mutilation and abnormality, generally sketched in with the lightest of pens."

In addition to writing his own stories, James championed the works of Sheridan Le Fanu, whom he viewed as "absolutely in the first rank as a writer of ghost stories", editing and supplying introductions to Madame Crowl's Ghost (1923) and Uncle Silas (1926).

James's statements about his actual beliefs about ghosts are ambiguous. He wrote, "I answer that I am prepared to consider evidence and accept it if it satisfies me."

Views on literature and politics
James held strongly traditional views about literature. In addition to ghost stories, he also enjoyed reading the work of William Shakespeare and the detective stories of Agatha Christie. He disliked most contemporary literature, strongly criticising the work of Aldous Huxley, Lytton Strachey and James Joyce (whom he called "a charlatan" and "that prostitutor of life and language"). He also supported the banning of Radclyffe Hall's 1928 novel about lesbianism, The Well of Loneliness, stating, "I believe Miss Hall's book is about birth control or some kindred subject, isn't it? I find it difficult to believe either that it is a good novel or that its suppression causes any loss to literature."

When he was a student at King's, James had opposed the appointment of Thomas Henry Huxley as Provost of Eton because of Huxley's agnosticism; he later became Provost of Eton himself. In his later life James showed little interest in politics and rarely spoke on political issues. However, he often spoke out against the Irish Home Rule movement, and in his letters he also expressed a dislike for Communism. His friend A. C. Benson considered him to be "reactionary", and "against modernity and progress".

Reception and influence
H. P. Lovecraft was an admirer of James's work, extolling the stories as the peak of the ghost story form in his essay "Supernatural Horror in Literature" (1927). Another renowned fan of James in the horror and fantasy genre was Clark Ashton Smith, who wrote an essay on him. Michael Sadleir described James as "the best ghost-story writer England has ever produced". Marjorie Bowen also admired his work, referring to his ghost stories as "the supreme art of M. R. James". Mary Butts, another admirer, wrote the first critical essay on his work, "The Art of Montagu James", in the February 1934 issue of the London Mercury. Manly Wade Wellman esteemed his fiction. In The Great Railway Bazaar, Paul Theroux refers to "The Mezzotint" as "the most frightening story I know". In his list "The 13 Most Terrifying Horror Stories", T. E. D. Klein placed James's "Casting the Runes" at number one. E. F. Bleiler stated that James is "in the opinion of many, the foremost modern writer of supernatural fiction", and he described Ghost Stories of an Antiquary as "one of the landmark books in the history of supernatural fiction" and characterised the stories in James's other collections as "first-rate stories" and "excellent stories". Ruth Rendell has also expressed admiration for James's work, stating, "There are some authors one wished one had never read in order to have the joy of reading them for the first time. For me, M. R. James is one of these." David Langford has described James as the author of "the 20th century's most influential canon of ghost stories".

Sir John Betjeman, in an introduction to Peter Haining's book about James, shows how influenced he was by James's work:
In the year 1920 I was a new boy at the Dragon school, Oxford, then called Lynam's, of which the headmaster was C. C. Lynam, known as 'the Skipper'. He dressed and looked like an old Sea Salt, and in his gruff voice would tell us stories by firelight in the boys' room of an evening with all the lights out and his back to the fire. I remember he told the stories as having happened to himself. ... they were the best stories I ever heard, and gave me an interest in old churches, and country houses, and Scandinavia that not even the mighty Hans Christian Andersen eclipsed.
Betjeman later discovered the stories were all based on those of M. R. James.

H. Russell Wakefield's supernatural fiction was strongly influenced by the work of James. A large number of British writers deliberately wrote ghost stories in the Jamesian style; these writers, sometimes described as the "James Gang", include A. N. L. Munby, E. G. Swain, "Ingulphus" (pseudonym of Sir Arthur Gray, 1852–1940), Amyas Northcote and R. H. Malden, although some commentators consider their stories to be inferior to those of James himself. Although most of the early Jamesian writers were male, there were several notable female writers of such fiction, including Eleanor Scott (pseudonym of Helen M. Leys, 1892–1965) in the stories of her book Randall's Round (1929) and D. K. Broster in the collection Couching at the Door: Strange and Macabre Tales (1942). L. T. C. Rolt also modelled his ghost stories on James's work, but, unlike other Jamesian writers, set them in industrial locations, such as mines and railways.

James's stories continue to influence many of today's great supernatural writers, including Stephen King (who discusses James in the 1981 non-fiction book Danse Macabre) and Ramsey Campbell, who edited Meddling with Ghosts: Stories in the Tradition of M. R. James and wrote the short story "The Guide" in tribute. The author John Bellairs paid homage to James by incorporating plot elements borrowed from James's ghost stories into several of his own juvenile mysteries. Several of Jonathan Aycliffe's novels, including Whispers in the Dark and The Matrix are influenced by James's work. Aycliffe/MacEoin studied for his PhD in Persian Studies at King's College, Cambridge. This makes three King's College authors of ghost stories (James, Munby and Aycliffe).

Works inspired by James
The composer Kaikhosru Shapurji Sorabji wrote two pieces for piano with a link to James: Quaere reliqua hujus materiei inter secretiora (1940), inspired by "Count Magnus", and St. Bertrand de Comminges: "He was laughing in the tower" (1941), inspired by "Canon Alberic's Scrap-Book".

H. Russell Wakefield's story "He Cometh and He Passeth By!" (1928) is a homage to James's "Casting the Runes".

W. F. Harvey's ghost story "The Ankardyne Pew" (1928) is also a homage to James's work, which Harvey admired.

Gerald Heard's novel The Black Fox is an occult thriller inspired by "The Stalls of Barchester Cathedral".

Kingsley Amis' novel The Green Man is partly a homage to James's ghost stories.

Between 1976 and 1992, Sheila Hodgson authored and produced for BBC Radio 4 a series of plays which portrayed M. R. James as the diarist of a series of fictional ghost stories, mainly inspired by fragments referred to in his essay "Stories I Have Tried to Write". These consisted of Whisper in the Ear (October 1976), Turn, Turn, Turn (March 1977), The Backward Glance (22 September 1977), Here Am I, Where Are You? (29 December 1977), Echoes from the Abbey (21 November 1984), The Lodestone (19 April 1989), and The Boat Hook (15 April 1992). David March appeared as James in all but the final two, which starred Michael Williams. Raidió Teilifís Éireann also broadcast The Fellow Travellers, with Aiden Grennell as James, on 20 February 1994. All the stories later appeared in Hodgson's collection The Fellow Travellers and Other Ghost Stories (Ash-Tree Press, 1998).

On Christmas Day 1987, The Teeth of Abbot Thomas, a James parody by Stephen Sheridan, was broadcast on Radio 4. It starred Alfred Marks (as Abbot Thomas), Robert Bathurst, Denise Coffey, Jonathan Adams and Bill Wallis.

In 1989, Ramsey Campbell published the short story "The Guide", which takes an antiquarian on a macabre journey to a ruined church after following marginalia in a copy of James's guidebook Suffolk and Norfolk. In 2001, Campbell edited the anthology Meddling with Ghosts: Stories in the Tradition of M. R. James.

The novelist James Hynes wrote an updated version of "Casting the Runes" in his 1997 story collection Publish and Perish.

In 2003, Radio 4 broadcast The House at World's End by Stephen Sheridan. A pastiche of James's work, it contained numerous echoes of his stories while offering a fictional account of how he became interested in the supernatural. The older James was played by John Rowe, and the younger James by Jonathan Keeble.

Chris Priestley's Uncle Montague's Tales of Terror (2007) is a volume of ghost stories influenced by James in mood, atmosphere and subject matter, as the title suggests.

In 2008 the English experimental neofolk duo The Triple Tree, featuring Tony Wakeford and Andrew King from Sol Invictus, released the album Ghosts on which all but three songs were based upon the stories of James. One of the songs, "Three Crowns" (based on the short story "A Warning to the Curious"), also appeared on the compilation album John Barleycorn Reborn (2007).

In February 2012, the UK psychedelic band The Future Kings of England released their 4th album, Who Is This Who Is Coming, based on James's 'Oh, Whistle, and I'll Come to You, My Lad'. An instrumental work, it evokes the story from beginning to end, with the tracks segueing into one another to form a continuous piece of music.

On 23 February 2012 the Royal Mail released a stamp featuring James as part its "Britons of Distinction" series.

In 2013, the Fan Museum in London hosted two performances of The Laws of Shadows, a play by Adrian Drew about M. R. James. The play is set in James's rooms at Cambridge University and deals with his relationships with his colleague E. F. Benson and the young artist James McBryde.

On 9 January 2019, in the third episode of the seventh series of the BBC One programme Father Brown, titled "The Whistle in the Dark", the character Professor Robert Wiseman reads a collection of ghost stories by M. R. James and later suggests that the whistle in his possession in the one described in James's Oh, Whistle, and I'll Come to You, My Lad.

Comedian and writer John Finnemore is a fan of the ghost stories of M. R. James. His radio sketch series John Finnemore's Souvenir Programme, first broadcast in 2011, features the recurring character of a storyteller (a fictionalised version of Finnemore) who tells tall tales partly influenced by M. R. James's ghost stories. During the ninth series broadcast in 2021, which underwent a format change due to the coronavirus pandemic, Oswald 'Uncle Newt' Nightingale, analogous with Finnemore's storyteller character, meets M. R. James during the Christmas of 1898 as a young boy, who proceeds to tell him the story of The Rose Garden. Later in Uncle Newt's life (or earlier in the series), he tells an iteration of said story whilst babysitting Deborah and Myra Wilkinson.

In 2022, British post punk band Funboy Five released "Kissing the Ghost of M R James" and "A Warning to the Curious (Disturbed Mix)", a remix of a song, based on the James story, that first appeared on their 2019 release An Autumn Collection.

Adaptations

Television
There have been numerous television adaptations of James's stories. The very first TV adaptation was American—a 1951 version of "The Tractate Middoth" in the Lights Out series, called "The Lost Will of Dr Rant" and featuring Leslie Nielsen. It is available on several DVDs, including an Alpha Video release alongside Gore Vidal's Climax! adaptation of Doctor Jekyll and Mister Hyde, starring Michael Rennie.

The majority of television adaptations of James's works have been made in Britain. The best-known adaptations include Whistle and I'll Come to You (1968, directed by Jonathan Miller) and A Warning to the Curious (1972; directed by Lawrence Gordon Clark), starring Michael Hordern and Peter Vaughan respectively. The latter was part of an annual BBC series titled A Ghost Story for Christmas, which would ultimately produce five dramatizations of James's stories in the 1970s: The Stalls of Barchester (1971), A Warning to the Curious (1972), Lost Hearts (1973), The Treasure of Abbot Thomas (1974) and The Ash-tree (1975).

Although ITV produced four black-and-white adaptations of James's ghost stories between 1966 and 1968, no surviving copies are known to exist. However, a short preview trailer featuring several scenes from the 1968 adaptation of "Casting the Runes" survived and has been shown at cult film festivals. The trailer is also available on Network DVD's Mystery and Imagination DVD set. "Casting the Runes" was again adapted for television in 1979 as an episode of the ITV Playhouse series with Lawrence Gordon Clark directing and starring Jan Francis as the lead protagonist (a man in previous adaptations). It has been released by Network DVD which also includes a 20-minute adaptation of "Mr Humphreys and His Inheritance" (made in 1976 by Yorkshire Television as part of the Music Scene ITV Schools programme) and A Pleasant Terror, a 1995 ITV documentary about James.

In 1980, the BBC produced a series, aimed at older children, of readings of classic horror stories read by various actors entitled Spine Chillers. This included readings of James's stories "The Mezzotint", "The Diary of Mr Poynter" and "A School Story", all read by Michael Bryant. In December 1986, BBC2 broadcast partially dramatized readings by the actor Robert Powell of "The Mezzotint", "The Ash-Tree", "Wailing Well", Oh, Whistle, and I'll Come to You, My Lad and "The Rose Garden". In a similar vein, the BBC also produced a short series (M. R. James' Ghost Stories for Christmas) of further readings in 2000, which featured Christopher Lee as James, who (in character) read 30-minute adaptations of "The Stalls of Barchester Cathedral", "The Ash-tree", "Number 13" and "A Warning to the Curious".

The Ghost Story for Christmas strand was revived in December 2005, when BBC Four broadcast a new version of James's story "A View from a Hill", with "Number 13" following in December 2006. These were broadly faithful to the originals and were well received. A new version of Whistle and I'll Come to You, starring John Hurt, was broadcast by BBC Two on Christmas Eve 2010.

Ten of the BBC productions made between 1968 and 2010 (including three episodes of the Christopher Lee readings series) were released on DVD in October 2011 as a five-disc boxed set in Australia by Shock DVD, as The Complete Ghost Stories of M. R. James. A boxed set of the BBC's Ghost Stories For Christmas productions, including all of the M. R. James adaptations, was released in Britain in 2012, and an expanded six-disc set (including Robert Powell's series of readings from 1986, and readings from the BBC's 1980 Spine Chillers series for children) was released in 2013.

A new adaptation of "The Tractate Middoth", the directorial debut of Mark Gatiss, was broadcast on BBC Two on 25 December 2013. Gatiss also presented a new documentary, entitled M. R. James: Ghost Writer, which was screened directly afterwards; it featured scenes from the BBC television adaptations, along with Robert Lloyd Parry of the Nunkie Theatre Company performing as M. R. James himself and reading excerpts from his stories.

On 31 October 2014, the BBC daytime soap opera Doctors presented an adaptation of Oh, Whistle, and I'll Come to You, My Lad with Dr Al Haskey (played by Ian Midlane) substituted for Professor Parkins. "Whistle..." was written by Jeremy Hylton Davies and directed by Pip Short. The BBC website also produced a behind-the-scenes video of the production.

On Christmas Eve 2019, the BBC broadcast an adaptation of "Martin's Close", written and directed by Mark Gatiss, and starring Peter Capaldi. It became BBC Four's "most watched programme of 2019", with 1.5 million viewers.

In February 2021, the BBC announced another Christmas Gatiss adaptation: "The Mezzotint", now promoted to appear on BBC Two.

On 23 December 2022, continuing with the Gatiss Christmas ghost story adaptations, the BBC showed "Count Magnus" on BBC Two.

Radio 
1932 – The first broadcast of an M. R. James story was made on 27 October 1932 (four years before his death) during a Bach piano concert transmitted by the BBC Midlands Regional Programme. During the 20-minute interval, "A School Story" was read "from the studio" by Vincent Curran.

1938 – On 12 March, the BBC's London Regional Programme broadcast an adaptation of "Martin's Close" under the title Madam, Will You Walk? The 40-minute play was written by C. Whitaker-Wilson and produced by John Cheatle. The Radio Times printed the musical notation for the ghostly refrain and noted, "You will have had quite enough of that tune before the play has ended. You will hear it played by a string quartet... you will hear it sung by Judge Jeffries in court (an actual fact); and, worse still, you will hear it floating on a gale of wind, sung by a murdered girl near a lonely inn in a Devonshire village. That also is a fact."

1940 – The BBC broadcast a second version of "Martin's Close" on 4 April, this time as a 25-minute reading by John Gloag for the new Home Service.

1946 – World War II had done nothing to dampen the BBC's enthusiasm for "Martin's Close", and on 13 February, C. Whitaker-Wilson's 1938 script of Madam, Will You Walk? was remounted, this time produced by Noel Iliff. Whitaker-Wilson himself played the part of Judge Jeffreys in a 45-minute production for the BBC Home Service.

The same year, the anthology series Stories Old and New featured David Lloyd James reading a 20-minute version of "Lost Hearts" for the BBC Home Service on 16 September.

1947 – The BBC's Wednesday Matinee strand presented a version of "The Mezzotint", adapted by Ashley Sampson, with Martin Lewis as Dennistoun. The play was produced by John Richmond and transmitted on 21 May as the second half of a double bill, in an "approximate" 25-minute slot on the Home Service.

On 19 November, the fifteenth episode of the CBS radio series Escape was an adaptation of "Casting the Runes".

1949 – Oh, Whistle, and I'll Come to You, My Lad became the second instalment of the new Man in Black series, arranged for radio by John Keir Cross. George Owen played Professor Parkins, Charles Lefeaux was Colonel Wilson, while Valentine Dyall starred as the eponymous host. The 30-minute play was transmitted on 7 February on the BBC Light Programme and repeated on the Home Service on 6 April.

On 16 June the Home Service broadcast a 15-minute reading of "Rats" performed by Anthony Jacobs.

1951 – On 21 April, Saturday Matinee presented a version of "Casting the Runes" for the BBC Home Service. Roger Delgado appeared as Harrington, Derek Birch played Dunning and Australian actor Dodd Mehan starred as Karswell. The play was adapted by Simona Pakenham and produced by Leonarde Chase.

1952 – "The Uncommon Prayer Book" was dramatised by Michael Gambier-Parry for the regional BBC Home Service West. Broadcast on 24 April, the play was billed as a "ghost story for St. Mark's Eve" ("The prayer books, though repeatedly closed, are always found open at a particular psalm... above the text of this particular psalm is a quite unauthorised rubric 'For the 25th Day of April".) The 60-minute play was produced by Owen Reed and starred George Holloway as Henry Davidson. It was repeated on 26 November on BBC Home Service Basic as part of the Wednesday Matinee strand.

1954 – On 10 December, BBC Home Service Midland broadcast a version of "A Warning to the Curious", adapted by documentary maker Philip Donnellan.

1957 – The association between M. R. James and the festive period began on Christmas Day 1957 as Lost Hearts was read by Hugh Burden on the BBC Third Programme.

1959 – "The Tractate Middoth" was adapted as A Mass of Cobwebs by Brian Batchelor for the BBC's Thirty-Minute Theatre. It was produced by Robin Midgley and starred Peter Howell as William Garrett, with Edgar Norfolk as Eldred. It was first broadcast on the Light Programme on 28 April 1959 and received its first repeat 59 years later on 27 August 2018 on BBC Radio 4 Extra.

1963 – Charles Lefeaux had acted in the 1949 production of Oh, Whistle, and I'll Come to You, My Lad, and fourteen years later he would produce three M. R. James adaptations of his own. The first of these was "The Diary of Mr. Poynter", an entry in the Mystery Playhouse strand for the Home Service. ("My hair! Give me back my hair! Give me back my beautiful brown hair" teased the Radio Times.) The 15-minute play was again adapted by Philip Donnellan and starred Marius Goring as Denton.

Lefeaux's second production was a new version of "Martin's Close", this time adapted by Michael and Mollie Hardwick, again for Mystery Playhouse and the Home Service. The 30-minute piece starred Donald Wolfit as Judge Jeffreys and was transmitted on 20 August 1963.  ("What see you in the corner of the Court, that you fix your eyes on it and not on me, your Judge?" teased the Radio Times again.) The play was repeated on BBC Radio 4 Extra on 26 February 2018.

On 18 December 1963, "The Ash Tree" was dramatised for The Black Mass, an American anthology series broadcast on KPFA (Berkeley) and KPFK (Los Angeles). The series was produced by Eric Bauersfeld.

The final installment of Lefeaux's M. R. James trilogy came on Christmas Eve with another version of Oh, Whistle, and I'll Come to You, My Lad. ("Easy enough to whistle – but there's no telling what will answer.") Again adapted by Michael and Mollie Hardwick, and again broadcast on the Home Service, the production is notable for the casting of Michael Hordern as Parkins – a role he would reprise for Jonathan Miller's TV adaptation five years later. The 30-minute play was repeated on BBC Radio 4 Extra on New Year's Day, 2018.

Sound effects for "Martin's Close" and Oh, Whistle, and I'll Come to You, My Lad were provided by the BBC Radiophonic Workshop, and the original sound-effects reel was preserved in their archive.

1964 – Eric Bauersfeld's The Black Mass broadcast a second M. R. James adaptation, with "An Evening's Entertainment" airing on Hallowe'en Night.

1965 – A supernaturally-themed edition of Story Time aired on the Home Service on 23 March. A number of performers read from "stories in prose and verse", including Scottish ballads and James's "Wailing Well".

1968 – Three years later, Story Time presented five M. R. James stories read by Howieson Culff. The 30-minute episodes were produced by David Davis and broadcast weekly on BBC Radio 4 FM between 20 August and 17 September. Episodes were "The Mezzotint", "The Rose Garden", "The Haunted Dolls' House", "The Uncommon Prayer-Book" and "A Neighbour's Landmark". Selected episodes were repeated as Three Ghost Stories the following year.

1971 – Radio 3's Study on 3 presented a four-part analysis of The Horror Story. The second episode ("Ghosts") was transmitted on 23 December 1971 – the day before the first Ghost Story for Christmas aired on BBC1 – and featured a discussion with Jonathan Miller and a reading of "Lost Hearts" by Bernard Cribbins. The series was repeated the following year.

1974 – On 12 January, the CBS Radio Mystery Theater, hosted by E. G. Marshall, presented the episode "This Will Kill You", which was an updated, loose adaptation of "Casting the Runes".

1975 – Radio 4's Story Time presented a "Ghost Trilogy", broadcast over three consecutive days in December. The second edition, on 23 December, was an abridged version of "Number 13" read by Peter Barkworth.

1977 – Michell Raper was a BBC producer who had already made documentaries about Peter Underwood and the London Ghost Club. On 27 December, he presented a 30-minute talk entitled The Ghosts of M. R. James, which also featured readings by Gerald Cross, Norman Shelley and Kenneth Fortescue from "Wailing Well", "Lost Hearts", Oh, Whistle, and I'll Come to You, My Lad and "Rats".

1978 – On 2 May, the CBS Radio Mystery Theater presented The Figure in the Moonlight, a loose and uncredited adaptation of "The Mezzotint". In Roy Winsor's script, "The Department of Fine Arts at Wheeler College, New Hampshire, is bequeathed a collection of mostly worthless art: reproductions, some photographs, an engraving or two. Upon closer inspection, one of the items stands out for its clarity and tone: an engraving of a Victorian mansion with a flagstone path and a wide front porch. A mysterious figure seems to appear and disappear from the engraving, as if re-enacting an earlier encounter."

In the UK, the Hallowe'en edition of Radio 4's Forget Tomorrow's Monday ("a Sunday morning miscellany") featured Peter Underwood (president of the Ghost Club) talking "about all things strange, from Alchemy to Zombies", and Peter Cushing, who gave a reading of "Lost Hearts".

1980 – On 19 December, Oh, Whistle, and I'll Come to You, My Lad became Radio 4's Book at Bedtime. It was read in a 15-minute slot by Robert Trotter.

1981 – On 2 January, BBC Radio 4 broadcast an Afternoon Theatre play called "The Hex", written by Gregory Evans and loosely based on "Casting the Runes", starring Conrad Phillips, Peter Copley, Carole Boyer and Kim Hartman. The play was subsequently transmitted, in translation, in several other countries. The 60-minute play has been repeated regularly on BBC Radio 4 Extra since December 2014.

1982 – Radio 4 transmitted two M. R. James stories in the 15-minute Morning Story slot in 1982. "The Rose Garden" aired on 14 June, and "Rats" followed on 15 November. Both stories were read by Richard Hurndall and the series was produced by Michell "Mitch" Raper.

1983 – Morning Story also produced "The Haunted Doll's House" [sic] on 11 February the following year. The 15-minute tale was read by David Ashford and broadcast on Radio 4 Long Wave only.

1986 – Morning Story transmitted another reading of "Rats" on 9 June on BBC Radio 4. James Aubrey was the storyteller, with Mitch Raper again in the producer's chair. The 15-minute show was repeated on 7 October 2018 on Radio 4 Extra.

1997–98 – After a hiatus of eleven years, M. R. James returned to the British airwaves in 1997. Running nightly from 29 December through to 2 January, The Late Book: Ghost Stories featured readings of five tales: "Canon Alberic's Scrapbook", "Lost Hearts", "A School Story", "The Haunted Dolls' House" and "Rats". The stories were abridged and produced by Paul Kent and read by Benjamin Whitrow. Episodes were repeated regularly on BBC 7 (Later becoming BBC Radio 7) from December 2003, then on Radio 4 Extra from 2011. According to the BBC Genome database, the episodes were originally transmitted in a 30-minute slot; however, these listings may be incomplete, as all subsequent broadcasts have been 15 minutes long.

2000 – Radio 4's Woman's Hour Drama presented The Red Room, a nine-part anthology of ghost stories by various authors, told as part of an overarching story ("At a Christmas party, the young Rebecca West meets a mysterious stranger. Literary passions, among others, are aroused. What does it take to tell a good ghost story? A challenge is proffered, a battle of wits begins, as does a descent into dark imaginings.") The third episode was a version of "Casting the Runes", with Sean Baker as Dunning, while episode five was a dramatisation of "Count Magnus", with Charlie Simpson as Wraxall. The Red Room was dramatised by Robin Brooks and directed by Clive Brill, and the nine 15-minute instalments were broadcast between 18 and 29 December, with several – including the M. R. James adaptations – actually listed as "Ghost stories for Christmas" in the Radio Times.

2006 − On 15 March, Radio 4's Afternoon Play featured The Midnight House by Jonathan Hall, a drama influenced by "The Mezzotint". The play was repeated on Radio 4 on 2 July 2007 and has appeared several times on Radio 4 Extra since December 2015.

2007 − Radio 4 presented more M. R. James adaptations in the form of M.R. James at Christmas, a series of five plays in the Woman's Hour Drama slot. Stories adapted were Oh, Whistle, and I'll Come to You, My Lad starring Jamie Glover as Professor Parkins, "The Tractate Middoth" with Joseph Mlllson as Garrett and John Rowe as Eldred, "Lost Hearts" with Peter Marinker as Abney, "The Rose Garden" with Anton Lesser as George and Carolyn Pickles as Mary, and "Number 13" with Julian Rhind-Tutt as Dr Anderson. The plays were adapted by Chris Harrald and directed and produced by Gemma Jenkins. Each episode was introduced by Derek Jacobi as James himself. The series ran from Christmas Eve to 28 December, culminating in an original Jamesian drama, A Warning to the Furious. The episodes were released on CD as Spine Chillers by BBC Audio in 2008. They were repeated on BBC 7 in December 2009 and (under the title M. R. James Stories) on Radio 4 Extra in 2011 and 2018.

These plays would be the last M. R. James radio adaptations for some time. Although repeats of older plays continued on BBC 7 and Radio 4 Extra, it would be more than 10 years before any new dramatisations were produced.

2009 − The series Classic Tales of Horror included a reading of "The Mezzotint" delivered by Robin Bailey. The episode was transmitted on BBC Radio 7 on 9 October 2009 and repeated on 20 May the following year.

2011 − Radio 3's Twenty Minutes, an "eclectic arts magazine programme", featured a version of "A Warning to the Curious" on 13 June. The twenty-minute reading was by Alex Jennings, and the script produced and abridged by Justine Willett.

2018 – Woman's Hour Drama had broadcast the last M. R. James dramatisations before the hiatus. The slot was subsequently rebranded as 15-Minute Drama, and in 2018 introduced a new series, The Haunting of M. R. James. "Five of the most powerful tales by this master of the ghost story" were adapted by Neil Brand: "The Mezzotint", "Casting The Runes", "The Stalls of Barchester Cathedral", "A Warning to the Curious and "Rats". As had happened in 2007, the five adaptations were followed by an original drama, this time entitled The Haunting of M.R. James. The series aired daily from 17 to 21 December and was directed by David Hunter.

Also on 21 December, a series apparently entitled Classic Stories: Tales for Christmas was uploaded to BBC Sounds. The episodes included a reading of "The Mezzotint" performed by Sam Dale and produced by Justine Willett. The provenance of this series is something of a mystery as it appears to never have been broadcast prior to its appearance online.

2019 – Another website-only production was added to BBC Sounds on 21 June. The 25-minute reading of "Wailing Well" was performed by Joseph Ayre and produced as part of Classic Stories: Stories for Summer by Julian Wilkinson.

The second radio adaptation of the year arrived in the form of Ghost Stories from Ambridge, a spin-off from The Archers. The second episode, which aired on Radio 4 on New Year’s Eve, was a reading of "Lost Hearts" ("on a biting December night, in the darkened attic of Lower Loxley, Jim Lloyd enthrals an assembly of Ambridge residents with three chilling ghost stories from the turn of the last century", teased the BBC webpage.) John Rowe played narrator Jim Lloyd and the 14-minute script was abridged by Jeremy Osborne.

Other audio productions 
In the 1980s, a series of four double audio cassettes was released by Argo Records, featuring nineteen unabridged James stories narrated by Michael Hordern. The tapes were titled Ghost Stories (1982), More Ghost Stories (1984), A Warning to the Curious (1985) and No. 13 and Other Ghost Stories (1988). ISIS Audio Books also released two collections of unabridged James stories, this time narrated by Nigel Lambert. These tapes were titled A Warning to the Curious and Other Tales (four audio cassettes, six stories, March 1992) and Ghost Stories of an Antiquary (three audio cassettes, eight stories, December 1992).

In Spring 2007 UK-based Craftsman Audio Books released the first complete set of audio recordings of James's stories on CD, spread across two volumes and read by David Collings. The ghost story author Reggie Oliver acted as consultant on the project.

April 2007 also saw the release of Tales of the Supernatural, Volume One, an audiobook presentation by Fantom Films, featuring the James stories "Lost Hearts" read by Geoffrey Bayldon, "Rats" and "Number 13" by Ian Fairbairn, with Gareth David-Lloyd reading "Casting the Runes" and "There Was a Man Dwelt by a Churchyard". Volume Two was to follow in the summer.

Also in 2007, BBC Audio released Ghost Stories Volume One (including "A View from a Hill", "Rats", "A School Story", "The Ash Tree", and "The Story of a Disappearance and an Appearance") read by Derek Jacobi. Ghost Stories Volume Two followed in 2009 (including "A Warning to the Curious'" "The Stalls of Barchester Cathedral"', "The Mezzotint", and "A Neighbour's Landmark"').

As of 2010 the audiobooks site LibriVox offers a set of audio readings (available as free downloads) under the collective heading Ghost Stories of an Antiquary.

A full-cast audio dramatization of "Casting the Runes" was distributed by Audible in 2019. With a contemporary setting, it was scripted by Stephen Gallagher and featured Tom Burke and Anna Maxwell Martin, with Reece Shearsmith in the role of Karswell.

in 2020, a full cast, audio adaptation of Oh, Whistle, and I'll Come to You, My Lad was produced under the title "Whistle" by White Heron Theatre of Nantucket, Massachusetts. It was written and directed by Mark Shanahan with original audio production and music by John Gromada. The audio drama bears a contemporary setting and was set on Nantucket Island. Though it deviates from the source material in many aspects, it retains the original's core traits. The cast includes Steve Pacek Alexandra Kopko and Catherine Shanahan. The audio drama was broadcast on Nantucket's NPR affiliate station, WNCK, on October 31, 2020.

In 2018, Shadows at the Door: The Podcast began a series of full-cast adaptations of James' stories, including Number 13, Canon Alberic's Scrapbook and A Warning to the Curious. Episodes also featured full readings of Rats and There Was A Man Dwelt By a Churchyard.

Film
The only notable film version of James's work to date has been the 1957 British adaptation of "Casting the Runes" by Jacques Tourneur, titled Night of the Demon (known as Curse of the Demon in the US), starring Dana Andrews, Peggy Cummins and Niall MacGinnis. The Brides of Dracula (Terence Fisher, 1960) lifts the padlocked coffin scene from "Count Magnus", while Michele Soavi's 1989 film The Church—featuring a script co-authored by Dario Argento—borrows the motif of the "stone with seven eyes", as well as a few other important details, from "The Treasure of Abbot Thomas".

A new film adaptation of "Casting the Runes" was announced in 2013 by director Joe Dante. It was to be a modernised reimagining of the story, with James's character Dunning portrayed as a celebrity blogger, and Karswell as a successful motivational speaker and self-help guru with connections to the occult. Simon Pegg was attached to star. The film has yet to go into production.

Stage
The first stage version of "Casting the Runes" was performed at the Carriageworks Theatre in Leeds, England, on 9–10 June 2006 by the Pandemonium Theatre Company.

In 2006–2007 Nunkie Theatre Company toured A Pleasing Terror round the UK and Ireland. This one-man show was a retelling of two of James's tales, "Canon Alberic's Scrap-Book" and "The Mezzotint". In October 2007 a sequel, Oh, Whistle ..., comprising Oh, Whistle, and I'll Come to You, My Lad and "The Ash-tree", began to tour the UK. A third James performance, A Warning to the Curious, comprising the eponymous story and "Lost Hearts", began touring the UK in October 2009. Although Robert Lloyd Parry of Nunkie said in 2009 that the last would probably be his final M. R. James tour, he continued to tour the three productions in subsequent years, and in 2012 he announced a fourth production, Count Magnus (consisting of "Count Magnus" and "Number 13"), to premiere on 28 September of that year.

In the summer of 2011 the Crusade Theatre Company toured a new stage adaptation of Oh, Whistle, and I'll Come to You, My Lad in England.

Works

Scholarly works

 A Descriptive Catalogue of the Manuscripts in the Library of Peterhouse. Cambridge University Press, 1899. Reissued by the publisher, 2009. 
Walter Map : De Nugis Curialium (ed.) Anecdota Oxoniensia ; Mediaeval and Modern Series 14. Oxford : Clarendon Press, 1914. 
A Descriptive Catalogue of the Library of Samuel Pepys. Sidgwick and Jackson, 1923. Reissued by Cambridge University Press, 2009. 
A Descriptive Catalogue of the Manuscripts in the Fitzwilliam Museum. Cambridge University Press, 1895. Reissued by the publisher, 2009. 
A Descriptive Catalogue of the Manuscripts in the Library of Corpus Christi College, Cambridge. Volume 1; Volume 2. Cambridge University Press, 1912. Reissued by the publisher, 2009. 
A Descriptive Catalogue of the Manuscripts in the Library of Gonville and Caius College. Volume 1; Volume 2. Cambridge University Press, 1907. Reissued by the publisher, 2009; 
A Descriptive Catalogue of the Manuscripts in the Library of Jesus College. Clay and Sons, 1895. Reissued by Cambridge University Press, 2009. 
A Descriptive Catalogue of the Manuscripts in the Library of Pembroke College, Cambridge. Cambridge University Press, 1905. Reissued by the publisher, 2009. 
A Descriptive Catalogue of the Manuscripts in the Library of St John's College, Cambridge. Cambridge University Press, 1913. Reissued by the publisher, 2009. 
St. George's Chapel, Windsor : the woodwork of the choir. Windsor : Oxley & Son, 1933.

A Descriptive Catalogue of the McClean Collection of Manuscripts in the Fitzwilliam Museum. Cambridge University Press, 1913. Reissued by the publisher, 2009. 
Apocrypha Anecdota. 1893–1897.
Descriptive Catalogues of the Manuscripts in the Libraries of Some Cambridge Colleges. Cambridge University Press, 2009. 
Address at the Unveiling of the Roll of Honour of the Cambridge Tipperary Club.. 1916.
Henry the Sixth: A Reprint of John Blacman's Memoir. 1919.
Lists of manuscripts formerly in Peterborough Abbey library: with preface and identifications. Oxford University Press, 1926. Reissued by Cambridge University Press, 2010. 
New and Old at Cambridge' article on the Cambridge of 1882. 'Fifty Years', various contributors, Thornton Butterworth,1932The Apocalypse in Art. Schweich Lectures for 1927.
The Apocryphal New Testament. 1924.The Bestiary: Being a Reproduction in Full of the Manuscript Ii.4.26 in the University Library, Cambridge. Printed for the Roxburghe club, by John Johnson at the University Press, 1928.
The Biblical Antiquities of Philo. 1917.The Lost Apocrypha of the Old Testament. Vol. 1, 1920.
The Wanderings and Homes of Manuscripts. 1919.Two Ancient English Scholars: St Aldhelm and William of Malmesbury. 1931.
The Western Manuscripts in the Library of Emmanuel College. Cambridge University Press, 1904. Reissued by the publisher, 2009. The Western Manuscripts in the Library of Trinity College. Volume 1; Volume 2; Volume 3; Volume 4. Cambridge University Press, 1904. Reissued by the publisher, 2009. 

Ghost stories

First book publicationsGhost Stories of an Antiquary. 1904. 8 stories.More Ghost Stories. 1911. 7 stories.A Thin Ghost and Others. 1919. 5 stories.A Warning to the Curious and Other Ghost Stories. 1925. 6 stories.Wailing Well. 1928 (tale), Mill House Press, Stanford Dingley.

First magazine publication of uncollected tales
"After Dark in the Playing Fields", in College Days (Eton ephemeral magazine), no. 10 (28 June 1924), pp. 311–312, 314
"There Was a Man Dwelt by a Churchyard", in Snapdragon (Eton ephemeral magazine), 6 December 1924, pp. 4–5
"Rats", in At Random (Eton ephemeral magazine), 23 March 1929, pp. 12–14
"The Experiment: A New Year's Eve Ghost Story", in Morning Post, 31 December 1931, p. 8
"The Malice of Inanimate Objects", in The Masquerade (Eton ephemeral magazine), no. 1 (June 1933), pp. 29–32
"A Vignette", written 1935, in London Mercury 35 (November 1936), pp. 18–22

Reprint collectionsThe Collected Ghost Stories of M. R. James. 1931. Contains the 26 stories from the original four books, plus "After Dark in the Playing Fields" (1924), "There Was a Man Dwelt by a Churchyard" (1924), "Wailing Well" (1928), and "Rats" (1929). It does not include three stories completed between 1931 and James's death in 1936.Best Ghost Stories of M. R. James. 1944.The Ghost Stories of M. R. James. 1986. Selection by Michael Cox, including an excellent introduction with numerous photographs.Two Ghost Stories: A Centenary. 1993.The Fenstanton Witch and Others: M. R. James in Ghosts and Scholars. 1999. Contains seven unpublished or unfinished tales or drafts: "A Night in King's College Chapel" (1892?), "The Fenstanton Witch" (1924?), "John Humphreys" (unfinished, pre-1911), "Marcilly-le-Hayer"(story draft, pre-1929), "Speaker Lenthall's Tomb" (unfinished, 1890s?), "The Game of Bear" (unfinished) and "Merfield House" (unfinished). A Pleasing Terror: The Complete Supernatural Writings. 2001. Ash-Tree Press. Contains 40 stories: the 30 stories from Collected Ghost Stories, the three tales published after them and the seven items from The Fenstanton Witch and Others. It also includes some related non-fiction by James and some writings about him by others. It is the only complete collection of his ghost fiction, although revised versions of unfinished tales and drafts have subsequently appeared on the Ghosts and Scholars website, following further deciphering of James's handwriting.Count Magnus and Other Ghost Stories. 2005. Edited, with an introduction and notes, by S. T. Joshi.The Haunted Dolls' House and Other Ghost Stories. 2006. Edited, with an introduction and notes, by S. T. Joshi.Curious Warnings: The Complete Ghost Stories of M. R. James. 2012. Edited, reparagraphing the text for the modern reader, by Stephen Jones.

GuidebooksAbbeys. 1925.Suffolk and Norfolk. 1930.

Children's books
 The Five Jars. 1922.
 As translator: Forty-Two Stories, by Hans Christian Andersen, translated and with an introduction by M. R. James. 1930.

Memoirs
 Eton and King's, Recollections Mostly Trivial, 1875–1925, Cambridge University Press, 1925. .

References

Further reading
Bleiler, E. F. The Checklist of Fantastic Literature. Shasta Publishers, 1948.
Bloom, Clive. "M. R. James and His Fiction." in Clive Bloom, ed., Creepers: British Horror and Fantasy in the Twentieth Century. London and Boulder CO: Pluto Press, 1993, pp. 64–71.
Cox, Michael. M. R. James: An Informal Portrait. Oxford University Press, 1983. .
Haining, Peter. M. R. James: Book of the Supernatural. W. Foulsham, 1979. 
James, M. R. A Pleasing Terror: The Complete Supernatural Writings, ed. Christopher Roden and Barbara Roden. Ash-Tree Press, 2001. .
Joshi, S. T. Introductions to Count Magnus and Other Ghost Stories. Penguin Classics, 2005.  and The Haunted Dolls' House and Other Ghost Stories. Penguin Classics, 2006. .

 (concentrates on his scholarly work)
Sullivan, Jack. Elegant Nightmares: The English Ghost Story from Le Fanu to Blackwood. Ohio University Press, 1980. .
Tolhurst, Peter. East Anglia—a Literary Pilgrimage. Black Dog Books, Bungay, 1996. . (pp. 99–101).
Wagenknecht, Edward. Seven Masters of Supernatural Fiction. Greenwood Press, 1991. .
 Weighell, Ron. Dark Devotions: M. R. James and the Magical Tradition, Ghosts and Scholars 6 (1984):20–30

External links

Digital collections
 
 
 
 
 A complete chronological bibliography of all of his writings hosted by the University of Pennsylvania School of Arts and Sciences
 Shadows at the Door: The Podcast, a series of full-cast adaptations of James' stories

Analysis and scholarship
 Ghosts & Scholars – online magazine devoted to James and related literature and writers
 Chronological listing of M. R. James's ghost stories – compiled by Rosemary Pardoe, 2007
 A Thin Ghost – collections include comprehensive film & TV listing, bibliography of fictional works and James-related illustrations
 BBC Suffolk feature about M. R. James – concerning the author's links with Great Livermere and Suffolk
 "Fright Nights: The Horror of M. R. James" – article by Anthony Lane in The New Yorker''
 Great Thinkers: Uta Frith FBA on M. R. James FBA podcast, The British Academy
 
 

 
 

 
 

 
1862 births
1936 deaths
Alumni of King's College, Cambridge
Fellows of King's College, Cambridge
Provosts of King's College, Cambridge
People educated at Eton College
Provosts of Eton College
Fellows of the Society of Antiquaries of London
British medievalists
English antiquarians
20th-century English writers
English short story writers
Ghost story writers
English horror writers
English fantasy writers
People from Goodnestone, Dover
People educated at Temple Grove School
Members of the Order of Merit
Vice-Chancellors of the University of Cambridge
Fellows of the British Academy
English bibliographers
Corresponding Fellows of the Medieval Academy of America
English male short story writers
Weird fiction writers